Rishi Pahar is a Himalayan mountain peak, located in the Pithoragarh district of Uttarakhand state in India. It lies at the northeast corner of the ring of peaks surrounding the Nanda Devi Sanctuary, and on the eastern rim of the Nanda Devi Biosphere Reserve, just south of Trishuli and Hardeol. The Milam Glacier lies on its east flank. It marks the triple divide between the Milam, Dunagiri, and Uttari Rishi Ganga valleys. Rishi Pahar means 'The Peak of Saint' in Hindi.

The first ascent to the summit of Rishi Pahar was made in 1975 via the west ridge.

References

 Nanda Devi by Eric Shipton

Tourist attractions in Uttarakhand
Mountains of Uttarakhand
Geography of Pithoragarh district
Six-thousanders of the Himalayas